Just Plain Fancy is a children's picture book by Patricia Polacco. It was first published in 1990 by Bantam Books.

Plot
It tells the story of Naomi and Ruth, two young Amish girls. One day, they find a mysterious egg lying in the grass. They soon realize that this is a fancy egg. It is sparkly and multicolored and thoroughly unacceptable for the Amish way of life. It hatches into a fancy “chicken.” Amish people cannot have anything fancy, or they get kicked out. Naomi and Ruth fear for their precious fancy chicken, and for themselves. At a big gathering at their house, the bird is exposed. Naomi and Ruth are very frightened, especially when it flies at the elders and spreads its tail. They are shocked to find that it is actually a peacock!

See also
Amish

References

1990 children's books
American picture books
Amish in popular culture